Chris Dunk (born January 23, 1958) is a former professional tennis player from the United States.  

Dunk did not start playing tournament tennis until the age of 14. Four years later, at 18, he was a top 10 junior in singles and doubles and won the National Junior Hardcourt Doubles title. He attended the University of California, Berkeley in the fall of 1976 on a tennis scholarship. Dunk became a two-time All-American in 1978 and 1980. In his senior year, his university tennis team was ranked #1 in the U.S. after winning the 1980 Collegiate Indoor team title. Dunk and his doubles partner Marty Davis were ranked #1 doubles team in the U.S. during his senior season. Dunk finished his senior year ranked in the top 15 in singles as well. In 2006, in recognition of his success during college, Dunk and Davis were inducted into the University of California at Berkeley Sports Hall of Fame. Dunk turned pro in September 1980 after playing on the U.S Junior Davis Cup Team. 

Although ranked as high as 105 in singles, he enjoyed most of his tennis success playing doubles. Playing primarily with his college partner Marty Davis on the tour, he reached the quarterfinals at Wimbledon and the French Open, and he reached five finals and won two ATP doubles titles. In addition, he reached the semifinals of the mixed doubles at the US Open. He achieved a career-high doubles ranking of World No. 35 in 1984. As a doubles team, Dunk and Davis finished #10 on the ATP Grand Prix in 1982. He also recorded 28 doubles titles on the Challenger and Satellite tours throughout the world. He retired from the ATP tour in 1987.  

After his tennis career ended, Dunk has gone on to start several successful technology ventures, including CD Communications.

Career finals

Doubles:5 (2-3)

External links
 
 

American male tennis players
California Golden Bears men's tennis players
Tennis players from San Francisco
Living people
1958 births